Susan Fletcher may refer to:

 Susan Fletcher (American author) (born 1951)
 Susan Fletcher (British author) (born 1979)
 Sue Fletcher, Australian molecular biologist